Guntur district is one of the twenty six districts in the Coastal Andhra region of the Indian state of Andhra Pradesh. The administrative seat of the district is located at Guntur, the largest city of the district in terms of area and with a population of 670,073. It is bounded on the south by Bapatla district and on the west by Palnadu district.

The district is often referred to as the Land of Chillies. It is also a major centre for agriculture, education and learning. It exports large quantities of chillies and tobacco.

Etymology 

The district derives its name from its district headquarters, Guntur.

There are several opinions on the meaning and origin of the word Guntur. The word owes its origin to words like gundu (a rock), gunta (a pond) and kunta (1/3 of an acre). In Sanskrit Guntur is called Garthapuri (Guntlapuri).

The earliest reference to Guntur, a variant of Guntur, comes from the Idern plates of Ammaraja I (922-929 AD) of the Chalukyas of Vengi. Guntur also appears in another two inscriptions dated 1147 AD and 1158 AD.

History 
The original Sanskrit name (ancient Vedic culture) for Guntur was Garthapuri. The 'Agasthyeswara Sivalayam' in the old city of Guntur is an ancient temple for Siva. It has inscriptions on two stones in 'Naga Lipi' (ancient script). It is said that Agastya built the temple in the last Treta Yuga around the Swayambhu Linga and hence the name. The 'Nagas' were said to have ruled the region. The place of Sitanagaram and the Guthikonda Caves can be traced (through Vedic Puranas) back to the traditional timescale Treta Yuga and Dvapara Yuga. Guntur District is home to the second oldest evidence of human habitation in India, in the form of Palaeolithic (old Stone Age) implements. Ancient history can be traced from the time of Sala kings who ruled during the 5th century BCE. The earliest reference to Guntur, a variant of Guntur, comes from the Idern plates of Ammaraja I (922–929 CE), the Vengi Chalukyan King. Guntur also appears in two inscriptions dated 1147 and 1158 CE. Since the beginning of Buddhist time, Guntur stood in the forefront in matters of culture, education and civilisation. Gautama Buddha preached at Dharanikota/Dhanyakatakam near Guntur and conducted Kalachakra ceremony, which takes its antiquity to 500 BCE. Taranatha, a Buddhist monk writes: "On the full moon of the month Chaitra in the year following his enlightenment, at the great stupa of Dhanyakataka, the Buddha emanated the mandala of "The Glorious Lunar Mansions" (Kalachakra). Buddhists established universities in ancient times at Dhanyakataka and Amaravathi. Scores of Buddhist stupas were excavated in the villages of Guntur district. Acharya Nagarjuna, an influential Buddhist philosopher taught at Nagarjunakonda and is said to have discovered Mica in 200 BCE. Chinese traveller and Buddhist monk Hiuen Tsang (Xuanzang) visited Amaravati in 640 C.E., stayed for sometime and studied 'Abhidhammapitakam'. He observed that there were many Viharas and some of them were deserted, which points out that Hinduism was gaining ground at that time. Xuanzang wrote a glorious account of the place, Viharas and monasteries that existed.

Guntur was successively ruled by famous dynasties such as the Satavahanas, Andhra Ikshvakus, Pallavas, Ananda Gotrikas, Vishnukundina, Kota Vamsa, Chalukyas, Cholas, Kakatiyas, Musunuris, Reddys, Vijayanagara and Qutb Shahis during ancient and medieval times. The famous battle of Palnadu which is enshrined in legend and literature as Palnati Yuddham was fought in Guntur district in 1180 CE.

Qutb Shahis, Nizams and later
During the 16th century Guntur became part of the Mughal empire. In 1687 CE when the emperor Aurangzeb conquered the Qutb Shahi sultanate of Golconda, of which Guntur was then a part. In 1724 CE, Asaf Jah, viceroy of the empire's southern provinces, declared his independence as the Nizam of Hyderabad. The coastal districts of Hyderabad, known as the Northern Circars, were occupied by the French in 1750. During this time, the Manur Rao family of Deshastha Brahmin community, the Vasireddi family of Kamma community and the Manik Rao family of Velama community were prominent Zamindar families in the present day Guntur district. The Manur Rao family were rulers of Chilakaluripet Zamindari and Sattenapalle Zamindari, The Vasireddi family were rulers of  Amaravathi Zamindari and The Manik Rao family were the rulers of Repalle Zamindari.

Post Independence 

The Guntur region played a significant role in the struggle for independence and the formation of Andhra Pradesh. The northern, Telugu- speaking districts of Madras State, including Guntur, advocated to become a separate state after independence. The new state of Andhra region named Andhra State, was created in 1953 from the eleven northern districts of Madras State. In 1970, part of Guntur district was split off to become part of the Prakasam district.

The district suffers from Naxalite insurgency and is a part of the Red corridor.

Geography 

The district is bounded on the southeast by the Bay of Bengal, on the south by Bapatla district, on the west by Palnadu district  and on the northwest by NTR district and north east Krishna district.

Guntur Coast is located on the south east coast of India (also known as the Coromandel Coast) (quotes from NASA site). Krishna river merges into Bay of Bengal at the coastal area of Guntur district. The braided stream channels, broad floodplain, and extensive sandbars suggest that this part of the Krishna river flows through relatively flat terrain and carries substantial amounts of sediment, especially during the monsoon season. Suryalanka Beach near Bapatla, Bobbarrlanka in Repalle, Nizampatnam Beach in Nizampatnam are tourist beaches in Guntur coastline.

Demographics 

The total population constitute, 2,440,521 males and 2,447,292 females – a sex ratio of 1003 females per 1000 males. The total urban population is 16,52,738 (33.81%). There are 29,60,441 literates with a literacy rate of 67.40%.

After bifurcation the district had a population of 20,91,075, of which 1,072,544 (51.29%) lived in urban areas. Guntur district had a sex ratio of 1007 females to 1000 males. Scheduled Castes and Scheduled Tribes make up 4,21,861 (20.17%) and 69,017 (3.30%) of the population respectively.

At the time of the 2011 census, 86.14% of the population spoke Telugu and 12.32% Urdu as their first language.

Administrative setup

Collectorate
The Collectorate play a pivotal role in the district administration. Collector in the cadre of IAS heads the district. He acts as the District Magistrate for maintaining Law and order in his jurisdiction. He deals mainly with planning and development. Law and Order, scheduled areas/ agency areas, general elections, arms licensing etc.

The Joint Collector, who also belongs to the IAS cadre, runs the Revenue administration under various enactments in the district. He is also designated as Additional District Magistrate. He mainly deals with civil supplies,land matters, mines and minerals,village officers etc.

The District Revenue Officer (DRO), in the cadre of Special Grade Deputy Collectors, assists the Collector and Joint Collector in discharging their duties. The District Revenue Officer looks after all the branches of the Collectorate. He deals mainly with general administration and is vested with supervision of day-to-day functions of the collectorate.

The administrative officer in the rank of a Tahsildar is the general assistant to the collector. He directly supervises all the sections in the collectorate and most of the files are routed through him.

The collectorate is divided into 8 sections as per the administrative reforms taken up by the Government of Andhra Pradesh.
 Section A:: Deals with Establishment and Office Procedures
 Section B:: Deals with Accounts and audit
 Section C:: Deals with Magisterial (Court/Legal) matters.
 Section D:: Deals with land Revenue and relief
 Section E:: Deals with Land Administration
 Section F:: Deals with Land Reforms
 Section G:: Deals with Land Acquisition
 Section H:: Deals with Protocol, elections and Residual work.

Administrative divisions

The district is divided into Two Revenue divisions, namely, Guntur, Tenali. These are sub-divided into 18 mandals, which are in turn divided as 57 Panchayat Samiti (Block)s, 712 villages and 16 towns. These 16 towns includes, 1 municipal corporation, 4 municipalities and 1 census town. Gurazala revenue division was newly formed in the year 2013. Guntur city is the only municipal corporation and district headquarter. Vaddeswaram is categorised as a census town. The 4 municipalities in the district are Mangalagiri, Tadepalle, Tenali, Ponnur.

Mandals 

The below table categorises the 18 mandals into their respective revenue divisions in the district:

Parliament segment

Guntur (Lok Sabha constituency)

Assembly segments

Guntur constituency presently comprises the following legislative assembly segments:

Village Panchayats

Guntur district has 1022 Gram Panchayats covering 58 mandals including seized mandals. Panchayat secretaries have been working for the cluster Headquarter Gram Panchayats. The main objective of the Panchayat Raj Department is to provide civic amenities to the rural public.

Erstwhile Talukas 

 Before Formation of mandals, Administration was done through Taluka system.
 Guntur District had 8 Talukas in 1971, later in 1978 they were increased to 21 Talukas.
 In 1985, Mandal system was created and 57 mandals were formed in the district.
In 2018, Guntur mandal is split into Guntur East and Guntur West mandals making a total of 58 mandals.

Cities and towns 

Note -

 Dachepalli Nagar Panchayat includes Dachepalli and Nadikudi.
 Gurazala Nagar Panchayat includes Gurazala and Jangamaheswaram.

Culture 

The district has many festivals such as Rama Navami, Maha Sivaratri, Vinayaka Chavithi, Vijaya Dasami, Deepawali, Holi, Ugadi, Eid, Krishnastami, Christmas. There are hill temple festivals at Kotappakonda, Mangalagiri.

Tourism 

Places of historical importance in the district include Ponnur, Undavalli Caves, Gurazala, Mangalagiri, Tadepalle, Tenali and the archaeological museum in Guntur. There are many places of interest like Undavalli Caves.

Tradition and spirituality 

Prolaya Vema Reddi built number of Lord Shiva temples during his reign. Number of temples were constructed in Krishna valley during the reign of Vasireddy Venkatadri Nayudu. Tall towers (Gaali Gopuram) of these temples in many villages and towns of Guntur district stand testimony to his devotion and munificence. Some of the famous destinations are Nadivelamma Talli Temple in Rajavolu, and there will be annual festival on Full moon day in the month of Chaitra maas. Amaravathi temple, the abode of Lord Shiva, present in the form of a  Shiva Linga. The Auspicious Hill of Mangalagiri town, is dedicated to Lord Narasimha with three temples of Panakala Narasimha Swamy on the hill, Lakshmi Narasimha Swamy at the foot of the temple, Gandala Narasimha Swamy at the top of the hill, are also famous. Other famous temples are Bhavanarayanaswami temple in Bapatla, Sri Laxmi Chennakesava Swamy Temple in Macherla, Kotappakonda, Pedakakani, Vykuntapuram in Tenali.and also subramaneswara Swamy temple,polleramathalli temple, agastheswaraswamy temple (which was built in 8 century by agasthaya mahrashi and rebuilt by Sri Krishna Devaraya)

Economy 

The primary, secondary and tertiary sectors of the district contribute ,  and  respectively to the GDDP.

The major products contributing to the GVA of the district from agriculture and allied services are paddy, cotton kapas, chillies, banana, milk, meat and fisheries. The GVA to the industrial and service sector is contributed from construction, electricity, manufacturing, transport and education.

Healthcare 

Healthcare is provided by government and private institutions. The Guntur Government Hospital provides free healthcare. All India Institute of Medical Sciences (AIIMS) is situated in Mangalagiri. The nonprofit or charity hospitals are the Sankara Eye Hospital.

Transport 
There exists  of rail network in the district.

Education and research 

The primary and secondary school education is imparted by government, aided and private schools, under the School Education Department of the state. As per the school information report for the academic year 2015–16, there are a total of 4,739 schools. They include, 32 government, 2,839 mandal and zilla parishads, 2 residential, 1329 private, 14 model, 24 Kasturba Gandhi Balika Vidyalaya (KGBV), 296 municipal and 203 other types of schools. The total number of students enrolled in primary, upper primary and high schools of the district are 637,031. The district being home to the capital city, it is experiencing a growth in private international schools as well. The Central Board of Secondary Education, Secondary School Certificate or the Indian Certificate of Secondary Education are the different types of syllabus followed by different schools. The medium of instruction followed by different schools are English, Telugu and Urdu.

There are several junior colleges which are under government, residential, social welfare, disabled welfare, private aided and unaided for the purpose of imparting (10+2) education and the students sit for the certificate of Board of Intermediate Education. AC college is the oldest private aided college of the district, established in 1885. The higher education colleges have various fields of study like medical, nursing, degree, post graduate, polytechnic, law, teaching, pharmacy, engineering, veterinary etc. The Acharya Nagarjuna University is a state university which has fourteen autonomous colleges as per Universities Grant Commission. The KMC, GMC, AIIMS are some of the premier medical institutes in Guntur. There are also many private universities like Vignan University, KL University in the district. The Acharya N. G. Ranga Agricultural University at Lam is a public agricultural university, equipped with a Regional Agricultural Research Station.

Notable people 

 Aluri Chakrapani, film producer
 Jamuna, actress
 Krishna, film actor
 Kanna Lakshminarayana, former State Minister and BJP National Leader
 Posani Krishna Murali, actor, writer
 Dokka Manikya Vara Prasad, former State Minister
 Ambati Rayudu, former Indian Cricketer
 Kotha Raghuramaiah, Member of Parliament and former Central Minister
 N. G. Ranga, Member of Parliament 
 N. Bhaskara Rao, former Chief Minister of Andhra Pradesh
 Alla Ayodhya Rami Reddy, Member of Parliament and Founded Ramky Group of Companies
 A. V. Gurava Reddy, leading surgeon
 Bhavanam Venkatarami Reddy, former Chief Minister of Andhra Pradesh
 Kallam Anji Reddy, the founder of Dr. Reddy's Laboratories
 Kallam Satish Reddy present Chairman of Dr. Reddy's Laboratories
 Savitri, actress
 Sharada, actress and Member of Parliament
 Sumalatha, actress and Member of Parliament

See also 
 Timeline of Guntur
 List of people from Guntur
 Kollur Mine

References

Bibliography

External links 

 Official site
 Guntur district marked on OpenStreetMap

 
Districts of Andhra Pradesh
Coastal Andhra